Steven Yeun (born December 21, 1983), born as Yeun Sang-yeop, is a South Korean-American actor. Yeun initially rose to prominence for his roles as Glenn Rhee in the television series The Walking Dead (2010–2016) and Ben in the film Burning (2018). The latter earned him critical acclaim and several accolades. He also starred in and executive produced Minari (2020), earning him critical acclaim and a nomination for the Academy Award for Best Actor, becoming the first Asian American actor to receive this honor. He also became the first Asian-American actor to be nominated at the Screen Actors Guild for Outstanding Performance by a Male Actor in a Leading Role.

Yeun has also appeared in the films Okja (2017), Mayhem (2017), Sorry to Bother You (2018), The Humans (2021) and Nope (2022), and has voiced main characters in television series such as Voltron: Legendary Defender (2016–2018), Tales of Arcadia (2016–2021), Stretch Armstrong and the Flex Fighters (2017–2018), Final Space (2018–2021), Tuca & Bertie (2019–2022), and Invincible (2021–present).

Early life
Yeun was born in Seoul on December 21, 1983, to Je and June Yeun. His father was an architect in South Korea before moving his family in 1988 to Canada, where they lived in Regina, Saskatchewan. In Regina, he attended Ruth M. Buck Elementary School. He has a younger brother named Brian. The family later moved to the U.S. and settled in Taylor, Michigan, and then Troy, Michigan, where Yeun lived until he graduated from Troy High School in 2001. Growing up, Yeun's family spoke Korean at home.

Yeun was raised in a Christian household. His parents, who owned beauty-supply stores in Detroit, began calling him "Steven" after meeting a doctor by that name. He received a bachelor's degree in psychology with a concentration in neuroscience from Kalamazoo College in 2005. At Kalamazoo, he befriended the sister of comedian Jordan Klepper and she took him to see Klepper's improv show, which inspired him to take his first acting class and later follow Klepper to Chicago, where they joined The Second City.

Career

Early career
Yeun revealed to his parents that he planned to pursue an improv career in Chicago instead of enrolling in law school or medical school. His parents were unhappy with the decision, but supported him nonetheless and gave him two years to pursue acting. He moved to Chicago in 2005, living in the city's Lincoln Square with his brother. Shortly after graduation, he joined Stir Friday Night!, a Chicago-based Asian American sketch comedy troupe. Other alumni of the group include Danny Pudi, known for his role in Community. He joined The Second City in Chicago before moving to Los Angeles in October 2009.

The Walking Dead

Yeun's breakout role was the starring role of Glenn Rhee on The Walking Dead, an AMC television horror drama based on the comic book series of the same name. The series, which began in 2010, involves a group of characters who fight to survive in a violent apocalyptic world infested with flesh-eating zombies. The Walking Dead became the highest-rated series in cable television history, and seasons three through six of the show garnered the most 18 to 49-year-old viewers of any cable or broadcast television series. The series has received mostly positive reviews from professional television critics. Per Variety, Yeun was "a major part" of the show's success; his character developed "from a plucky young member of the show's central group to a bona fide action hero and sex symbol". Yeun left the show in 2016 after the season 7 premiere.

Movies
In March 2016, Yeun was cast in Joe Lynch's action horror movie Mayhem. The movie was released in theaters on November 10, 2017. In April 2016, Yeun was cast in Bong Joon-ho's action-adventure movie Okja. The movie is competed for the Palme d'Or in the main competition section at the 2017 Cannes Film Festival. It was released on Netflix on June 28, 2017. Yeun also provided the voice of Bo in 2017's The Star.

Yeun then co-starred in Boots Riley's dark comedy Sorry to Bother You alongside Lakeith Stanfield, Armie Hammer, and Tessa Thompson, which was released in theaters on July 6, 2018. The film had its premiere at the Sundance Film Festival in January 2018. The movie won The 2019 National Board of Review's Top Ten Independent Films award. It also won Best Screenplay and Best First Feature at the 2019 Independent Spirit Awards.

In late 2018, Yeun played Ben in the South Korean mystery drama film Burning, directed by Lee Chang-dong. The film was first unveiled at the 2018 Cannes Film Festival. His performance in the film was acclaimed. Yeun won Best Supporting Actor at the 2018 Los Angeles Film Critics Association Awards, Toronto Film Critics Association Awards 2018, Florida Film Critics Circle Awards 2018, and 2018 National Society of Film Critics Awards.

In 2020, Yeun starred in and served as an executive producer for Lee Isaac Chung's A24 immigrant drama Minari, which also includes Youn Yuh-jung, Han Ye-ri, Alan Kim, Noel Kate Cho, Will Patton and Scott Haze among the cast. The film is about a Korean immigrant family becoming farmers in Arkansas; Yeun included his own immigrant experience in his acting. The film had its world premiere and won two top awards at the Sundance Film Festival in January 2020. Yeun received an Academy Award for Best Actor nomination for Minari. In 2021, he was included in the Time 100, Times annual list of the 100 most influential people in the world for his appearance in Minari. In 2021, he co-starred alongside Jayne Houdyshell, Richard Jenkins and Amy Schumer, in Stephen Karam's award-winning one-act play adaptation The Humans.

In 2022, he co-starred alongside Daniel Kaluuya and Keke Palmer in Jordan Peele's science fiction horror film Nope, as Ricky "Jupe" Park, the owner of the fictional theme park Jupiter's Claim.

In February 2023, Yeun joined the cast of Thunderbolts in a significant role, set in the Marvel Cinematic Universe, to be released on July 26, 2024.

Other television work
Yeun does voice acting in both animated television series and films. Some of these roles include Avatar Wan in the second season of The Legend of Korra, Steve Palchuk in Trollhunters and 3Below, Keith in Voltron: Legendary Defender, Nathan Park/Wingspan in Stretch Armstrong and the Flex Fighters, Little Cato in Final Space, and Speckle in Tuca & Bertie.

It was later revealed that Yeun's role as Steve Palchuk would continue into Wizards, the third series of the Tales of Arcadia trilogy. The first season of 3Below was released on Netflix on December 21, 2018, and the second and final season was released on July 12, 2019.

In late 2018, Yeun landed a main role in an episode of Jordan Peele's revival of The Twilight Zone. He currently voices the title protagonist Mark Grayson in the animated superhero series Invincible, adapting Robert Kirkman's comic book series, which released on Amazon Prime in March 2021.

Yeun is set star opposite Ali Wong in Netflix's thriller drama series Beef.

Personal life
Yeun married photographer Joana Pak on December 3, 2016. They reside in Los Angeles and have two children together.

He is a longtime fan of the Detroit Pistons and Detroit Red Wings, and endorsed Andrew Yang for president in the 2020 U.S. election.

Filmography

Film

Television

Music videos

Video games

Awards and nominations

References

External links

 
 

1983 births
Living people
American male television actors
Kalamazoo College alumni
South Korean emigrants to the United States
Male actors from Chicago
People from Troy, Michigan
21st-century American male actors
Male actors from Detroit
American restaurateurs
American male film actors
American male voice actors
American male actors of Korean descent